Ian Orme (9 August 1952 – 19 June 2018) was a British-American microbiologist who was a Distinguished Professor at Colorado State University.

References

1952 births
2018 deaths
Colorado State University faculty
American microbiologists